Marie Shannon (born 1960) is a New Zealand artist and educator who makes photography, video and drawing.

Background and education 
Shannon was born in Nelson in 1960. She went to the University of Auckland Elam School of Fine Arts and graduated in 1982 with a major in photography.

Shannon is based in Auckland, New Zealand.

Career 
Shannon's art is often centred around her domestic interiors and the creative process between her and other artists. Shannon represented New Zealand at Australia's Asia-Pacific Triennale in 1996, and was exhibited in the Australian Centre for Photography in Sydney. Then in 1998 her work was at New Plymouth's Govett-Brewster and Melbourne's ACCA.

Shannon's partner was artist Julian Dashper who died in 2009. She has made cataloguing his art works into art which are text-based videos. An example is The Aachen Faxes, Christchurch remix at the Christchurch Art Gallery. In a review of a retrospective of Shannon's work the comment is made that she was overshadowed by her partner Dashper.

As an educator she works at Unitec, Auckland.

Selected exhibitions 
1992 - Headlands: Thinking through New Zealand Art, MCA, Sydney, Australia
2000 - Fissure, Five Shows, Five Curators, ACProjects, New York, USA
2009 - Large Still Life, Sue Crockford Gallery, Auckland
2009 - Love Notes (solo), Courtenay Place light boxes, Off-site project of City Gallery, Wellington
2009 - Marie Shannon, Hamish McKay Gallery, Wellington
2011 - What I Am Looking At, Sue Crockford Gallery, Auckland
2012 - The Aachen Faxes, Hamish McKay Gallery, Wellington
2015 - Julian Dashper and Friends, City Gallery Wellington
2015 - The things we talked about, ST PAUL St Gallery, Auckland University of Technology
2015 - TRUTH + FICTION, Trish Clark Gallery, Auckland
2016 - Notes and Letters (solo), PS Project Space, Amsterdam, Netherlands
2016 - THE XX FACTOR, Trish Clark Gallery, Auckland
2016 - this is the cup of your heart, The Dowse, Lower Hutt
2017 - An Architecture of Things, Trish Clark Gallery, Auckland
2017 - Rooms found only in the home, Dunedin Public Art Gallery
2018 - Rooms found only in the home (solo), Adam Art Gallery, Wellington
2018 - Rooms found only in the home (solo), Christchurch Art Gallery Te Puna o Waiwhetū
2018 - Short Stories (solo), Trish Clark Gallery, Auckland
2019 - Here we are, Art Gallery of New South Wales, Sydney, Australia
2019 - Rooms found only in the home (solo), Te Uru, Auckland
2020 - Rooms found only in the home (solo), Museum of Contemporary Art, Sydney, Australia (cancelled due to Covid-19)

Collections
Shannon's work is held in the following permanent collections:
Christchurch Art Gallery Te Puna o Waiwhetū
Auckland Art Gallery Toi o Tāmiki

References 

Living people
New Zealand artists
1961 births
People from Nelson, New Zealand
Academic staff of Unitec Institute of Technology